Pasquale Stanislao Mancini, 8th Marquess of Fusignano (17 March 1817 – 26 December 1888) was an  Italian jurist and statesman.

Early life

Mancini was born in Castel Baronia, in the Kingdom of the Two Sicilies (present-day Province of Avellino). He became well established in intellectual circles in Naples, editing and publishing a number of newspapers and journals, and gained a reputation in law after the 1841 publication of his correspondence with Terenzio Mamiani on the right to punish. He did not attend university, but rather was educated privately, and was granted a law degree in 1844 by a special exemption.

Career 
In 1848 he was instrumental in persuading Ferdinand II to participate in the war against Austria. Twice he declined the offer of a portfolio in the Neapolitan cabinet, and upon the triumph of the reactionary party undertook the defence of the Liberal political prisoners.

Threatened with imprisonment in his turn, he fled to Piedmont, where he obtained a professorship at the University of Turin and became preceptor of the crown prince Humbert. In 1860 he prepared the legislative unification of Italy, opposed the idea of an alliance between Piedmont and Naples, and, after the fall of the Bourbons, was sent to Naples as administrator of justice, in which capacity he suppressed the religious institutes, revoked the Concordat, proclaimed the right of the state to Church property, and unified civil and commercial jurisprudence.

In 1862 he became minister of public instruction in the Rattazzi cabinet, and induced the Chamber to abolish capital punishment. Thereafter, for fourteen years, he devoted himself chiefly to questions of international law and arbitration, but in 1876, upon the advent of the Left to power, became minister of justice in the Depretis cabinet. His Liberalism found expression in the extension of press freedom, the repeal of imprisonment for debt, and the abolition of ecclesiastical tithes.

During the Conclave of 1878 he succeeded, by negotiations with Cardinal Pecci (afterwards Leo XIII), in inducing the Sacred College to remain in Rome, and, after the election of the new pope, arranged for his temporary absence from the Vatican for the purpose of settling private business. Resigning office in March 1878, he resumed the practice of law, and secured the annulment of Garibaldi's marriage. The fall of Cairoli led to Mancini's appointment (1881) to the ministry of foreign affairs in the Depretis administration. The growing desire in Italy for alliance with Austria and Germany did not at first secure his approval; nevertheless he accompanied King Humbert to Vienna and conducted the negotiations which led to the informal acceptance of the Triple Alliance.

His desire to retain French confidence was the chief motive of his refusal in July 1882 to share in the British expedition to Egypt, but, finding his efforts fruitless when the existence of the Triple Alliance came to be known, he veered to the English interest and obtained assent in London to the Italian expedition to Massawa. An indiscreet announcement of the limitations of the Triple Alliance contributed to his fall in June 1885, when he was succeeded by Count di Robilant.

Personal life 
He married poet Laura Beatrice Mancini in 1840, and she ran a literary salon for liberal-minded Neapolitans out of their house.

Death 
He died in Naples in December 1888.

Works

References

 

1817 births
1888 deaths
People from the Province of Avellino
Education ministers of Italy
Foreign ministers of Italy
Politicians of Campania
19th-century Italian lawyers
Conflict of laws scholars
Members of the Institut de Droit International
Members of the Chamber of Deputies (Kingdom of Italy)
Deputies of Legislature VIII of the Kingdom of Italy
Deputies of Legislature IX of the Kingdom of Italy
Deputies of Legislature X of the Kingdom of Italy
Deputies of Legislature XI of the Kingdom of Italy
Deputies of Legislature XII of the Kingdom of Italy
Deputies of Legislature XIII of the Kingdom of Italy
Deputies of Legislature XIV of the Kingdom of Italy
Deputies of Legislature XV of the Kingdom of Italy
Deputies of Legislature XVI of the Kingdom of Italy